RCTV Sangbad (Sangbad meaning news in Bengali) is a regional Bengali language television channel owned by Raiganj Cable TV Private, Limited. It was launched on August 20, 2003, as a privatecompany. The channel runs a daily live broadcast from Raiganj, West Bengal.

The company also provides a set-top box. This channel provides viewers with news and entertainment.

History 
RCTV Sangbad started as a broadcasting network named Manthan Yep Broadband Services Pvt. Ltd. In 2013, they joined GTPL Kolkata Cable and Broadband Priseva Ltd.

See also 

 List of Bengali-language television channels in India
 Sadhna News
 Kolkata TV
 High News
Hindustan Times

References

External links 

 

Cable television
2003 establishments in West Bengal
Television channels and stations established in 2003
Bengali-language television channels in India